Gârceni is a commune in Vaslui County, Western Moldavia, Romania. It is composed of six villages: Dumbrăveni, Gârceni, Racova, Racovița, Slobozia and Trohan.

References

Communes in Vaslui County
Localities in Western Moldavia